The Promised Reformer Day (Urdu: Yawm-e-Musleh Maud) is celebrated by Ahmadi Muslims annually on 20 February in remembrance of the prophecy concerning the birth of an "illustrious son" to Mirza Ghulam Ahmad whom the Ahmadis regard as the Promised Messiah and Mahdi, and its fulfilment in the person of Mirza Bashir-ud-Din Mahmud Ahmad, the second Caliph of the Ahmadiyya Muslim Community. It is not a celebration of Mahmud Ahmad's birth which occurred on 12 January, but rather the commemoration of the prophecy and its fulfilment in his person.

Background

In the 1880s, Mirza Ghulam Ahmad confronted several Hindu leaders who demanded to show them signs in favour of Islam as a living religion. In response to this, Mirza Ghulam Ahmad travelled to the town of Hoshiarpur where he spent 40 days in seclusion praying for divine signs in favour of Islam over other faiths. Subsequently, on 20 February 1886 he published a revelation which contained the prophecy concerning the birth of an illustrious son:

Fulfilment of the Prophecy 

Mirza Ghulam Ahmad further declared on April 8, 1886 that it was disclosed to him that this son will be born within a period of nine years. However a few days after this announcement his wife, Nusrat Jehan gave birth to a daughter and his adversaries began alleging that his prophecy was proved false. Again in August 1887 a son was born to him but died in infancy, and again his critics alleged that the prophecy was falsified. Ghulam Ahmad pointed out that this son was the 'guest’ that was promised, and that the prophecy concerning the promised son began from the passage He will be accompanied by grace (Fazl) which shall arrive with him. On January 12, 1889, Mirza Mahmud Ahmad was born who is believed by the Ahmadiyya Muslim Community to be the promised son and one who according to Ahmadis displayed in his person all the qualities mentioned in the prophecy.

Ahmadis believe that the fulfilment of the prophecy spans the 52-year-long Caliphate of  Mirza Bashir-ud-Din Mahmood Ahmad.

Celebrations

Unlike Jalsa Salana which is often planned at national or International levels, Promised Reformer's Day is celebrated usually at a local or a regional level.

The Head of Worldwide Ahmadiyya Muslim Community, Mirza Masroor Ahmad, states the purpose of celebrating Musleh Maud Day as follows:

Notes

References 

Ahmadiyya events
February observances
Islamic terminology